Thomas Dixon Craig (November 20, 1842 – April 4, 1905) was a merchant and political figure in Ontario, Canada. He represented Durham East in the Legislative Assembly of Ontario from 1886 to 1890 and in the House of Commons of Canada from 1891 to 1900 as an Independent Conservative member.

He was born in London, England in 1842 and came to Upper Canada with his family the following year. Craig was educated at the University of Toronto. He was a tanner in Port Hope.

External links 
The Canadian parliamentary companion, 1897 JA Gemmill
Member's parliamentary history for the Legislative Assembly of Ontario

1842 births
1905 deaths
Progressive Conservative Party of Ontario MPPs
Independent Conservative MPs in the Canadian House of Commons
Members of the House of Commons of Canada from Ontario
University of Toronto alumni